Daily Tribune may refer to the following newspapers:

 Daily Tribune (Philippines), an English-language broadsheet
 Daily Tribune (Bahrain), also known as News of Bahrain

United States 
 Daily Tribune (Ames, Iowa), now The Ames Tribune
 Daily Tribune (Oklahoma, 1915–1939), merged into the Blackwell Journal-Tribune
 Daily Tribune (Wyoming, 1916–1925), merged into the Casper Star-Tribune
 Daily Tribune (Michigan, 1849–1862), merged into the Detroit Tribune
 Wisconsin Rapids Daily Tribune